Dubravko Mataković may refer to:

 Dubravko Mataković (canoeist) (1942–2019), Yugoslav slalom canoeist
 Dubravko Mataković (illustrator) (born 1959), Croatian illustrator best known for his grotesque comic books